Juntura is an unincorporated community in Malheur County, Oregon, United States on U.S. Route 20. The word juntura is Spanish for "juncture", and the community was named for its proximity to the confluence of the Malheur River with the North Fork Malheur River. The name was probably selected by local settler B. L. Milligan, who arrived in the area in the 1880s and who later served as county school superintendent. Juntura post office was established in 1890 and is still operating. The community's development slowed after World War II, and on November 2, 1976, the town voted to disincorporate. Juntura is part of the Ontario micropolitan area.

Climate
According to the Köppen Climate Classification system, Juntura has a semi-arid climate, abbreviated "BSk" on climate maps.

Transportation
In the 21st century, Juntura is a stop on the Eastern POINT intercity bus line between Bend and Ontario. It makes one stop per day in each direction.

Education
It is in the Juntura School District 12, an elementary school district. It operates Juntura Grade School. In 1975 the school began paying students to do janitorial work after the teacher, who previously worked at the Fields. The janitorial duties each student has were rotated weekly. The students used the money to fund field trips. In 1979 the school had 26 students, with 11 in grades 5-7 and none in the 8th grade.

High school students go to Vale High School of the Vale School District. In 1979 students lived in Vale on weekdays.

The section of Malheur County in which this community is located in is not in any community college district.

References

Former cities in Oregon
Populated places established in the 1880s
Unincorporated communities in Malheur County, Oregon
Census-designated places in Oregon
1880s establishments in Oregon
1976 disestablishments in Oregon
Unincorporated communities in Oregon
Populated places disestablished in 1976